The 2014–15 season was K.A.A. Gent's 112th season in existence and 26th consecutive season in the top flight of Belgian football, the Belgian Pro League. The club also competed in the Belgian Cup

Match details
League positions are sourced by Statto, while the remaining information is referenced individually.

Belgian Pro League

Regular season

Championship play-offs

Belgian Cup

Transfers

Transfers in

Loans in

Transfers out

Loans out

References

K.A.A. Gent seasons
Gent, K.A.A.
Belgian football championship-winning seasons